The simple station Niza Calle 127 is part of the TransMilenio mass-transit system of Bogotá, Colombia, which opened in the year 2000.

Location 

The station is located in northwestern Bogotá, specifically on Avenida Suba with Calles 127 and 127D.

It serves the Niza, Calatrava, and Las Villas neighborhoods.

History 
In 2006, phase two of the TransMilenio system was completed, including the Avenida Suba line, on which this station is located.

The station is named Niza-Cll 127 for its proximity to the Niza neighborhood and the arterial road Avenida Calle 127.

Nearby are the Niza and Bulevar Niza shopping centers.

Station services

Main line service

Feeder routes 

This station does not have connections to feeder routes.

Inter-city service 

This station does not have inter-city service.

External links 
 TransMilenio

See also 
 Bogotá
 TransMilenio
 List of TransMilenio Stations

TransMilenio